Lilian M. C. Marijnissen (born 11 July 1985) is a Dutch politician serving as Leader of the Socialist Party and ex officio its parliamentary leader in the House of Representatives since 13 December 2017. She was first installed as a member of the House of Representatives on 23 March 2017 following the general election of 15 March.

Marijnissen is a daughter of Jan Marijnissen, a politician and formerly the leader of the same party. Her mother is Mari-Anne Marijnissen. Lilian Marijnissen previously served as a member of the municipal council of Oss from 2003 to 2016 like her mother before her.

References

External links
Official

  L.M.C. (Lilian) Marijnissen MA, Parlement.com

1985 births
Living people
21st-century Dutch politicians
21st-century Dutch women politicians
Dutch anti-poverty advocates
Dutch trade union leaders
Leaders of the Socialist Party (Netherlands)
Members of the House of Representatives (Netherlands)
Municipal councillors of Oss
Radboud University Nijmegen alumni
Socialist Party (Netherlands) politicians
University of Amsterdam alumni
20th-century Dutch women